Nick Graham is a British vocalist, songwriter, flautist, pianist and bassist. He was one of the original members of the English progressive rock band Atomic Rooster from 1969 to 1970. He is sometimes mistakenly named as a member of the End and Tucky Buzzard, but that was a different musician with a similar name.

Bands

 1969–1970 – Founder member of Atomic Rooster with Vincent Crane and Carl Palmer. Recorded and co-wrote the first Atomic Rooster album.
 1970–1974 – Skin Alley – Recorded and co-wrote three albums To Pagham and Beyond (CBS), Two Quid Deal and Skintight (Transatlantic). Skintight was produced by the legendary Don Nix and was released on STAX Records in the US.
 1974 Edwin Starr – toured as bass player in Starr's backing band.
 1977–80 – Alibi, formed originally in 1976 as a songwriting project, with Tony Knight. Charlie Morgan subsequently replaced Tony on drums, with Geoff Sharkey (guitars) and Mark Fisher (keyboards) joining later for touring and some recording. The album was first recorded at Island Records' Basing Street Studios with Muff Winwood and Rhett Davies producing. However, for reasons beyond the band's control this version was never released. The band then signed to Magnet Records and a second version was recorded at Chipping Norton Recording Studios with Chris Rea as producer – this is the one that was released in 1980 and the title song "Friends" was a radio hit.
 1980–83 – studied for BA Humanities (Hons) in Music and History of Art at Ealing College of Higher Education.
 1983–84 – studied for PGCE in Music Education at Reading University.
 1985 – The Explorers featuring Phil Manzanera and Andy Mackay. Toured through summer 1985 playing piano/synths and featured on the CD/DVD Explorers Live at Camden Palace.
 1986 – songwriting: around this time Graham began to write songs for other artists, with various co-writers. He co-wrote the song "The Flame" with Bob Mitchell, which went to No. 1 on the Billboard Hot 100 for Cheap Trick in 1988, as well as  "Remember My Name" for House of Lords, which reached No. 72 on the Hot 100 in 1990.
 1992 – David Jackson
 1992–1995 – Jess Roden and The Humans
 1998–2001 – Reduced Shakespeare Company
 2003 – Jim Capaldi Band

References

Year of birth missing (living people)
Living people
British songwriters
British rock bass guitarists
British rock singers
British male singers
British rock flautists
British session musicians
Atomic Rooster members
Male bass guitarists
British male songwriters